The Avro 531 Spider was a prototype First World War British sesquiplane fighter aircraft built by Avro.

Design and development
The Spider was a sesquiplane with a largely conventional configuration, but it used Warren truss-type interplane struts, hence the appellation "Spider". In tests, the aircraft demonstrated exceptional performance, handling, and pilot visibility however the time it flew, the War Office had already selected the Sopwith Snipe for mass production.

A second, more refined version, the Avro 531A, was apparently never completed, but some of its components seem to have been used to build a derivative, the Avro 538. This had standard interplane struts and was intended as a racing aircraft. It was never used for this purpose, however, because it was discovered that it had a faulty wing spar, so the Avro firm used it as a hack instead from May 1919 to September 1920.

Specifications (531)

References

Citations

Bibliography
 Donald, David, ed. The Complete Encyclopedia of World Aircraft. New York: Barnes & Noble Books, 1997, .
 Jackson, A.J. Avro Aircraft since 1908. London: Putnam Aeronautical Books, 1990. . 
 Taylor, Michael J. H. Jane's Encyclopedia of Aviation. London: Studio Editions, 1989, p. 93. 
 World Aircraft Information Files. London: Bright Star Publishing, File 889, Sheet 94.

1910s British fighter aircraft
Spider
Single-engined tractor aircraft
Sesquiplanes
Aircraft first flown in 1918
Rotary-engined aircraft